Chhatak Gas Field is a natural gas field located in Chhatak Upazila, Sunamganj District, Bangladesh. This company is under the control of Bangladesh Petroleum Exploration and Production Company Limited (BAPEX). For the first time in Bangladesh, gas connection was provided to the industrial sector from this gas field in 1959. In 1960, it provided approximately 4 million cubic feet of gas per day to Chhatak Cement Factory as well as pulp and paper mills.

Location
Chhatak gas field is located in Chhatak Upazila, Sunamganj district of Sylhet division, about 300 km northeast of the capital Dhaka. This gas field is basically operated by two different gas fields - Chhatak (East) and Tangrtila or Chhatak (West); Which is merged to a single field after 2001.

Explosion 
Two explosions have occurred at the gas field. One of them happened on January 7 2005, and the second happened on June 24 of the same year.

See also 
List of natural gas fields in Bangladesh
Bangladesh Gas Fields Company Limited
Sylhet Gas Fields Limited
Gas Transmission Company Limited

References 

1959 establishments in Asia
Chhatak Upazila
Economy of Sylhet
Natural gas fields in Bangladesh